Platon Alexeevich Obukhov (born 9 September 1968 in Moscow, USSR) is a Russian journalist, writer, translator and painter.

Writer, journalist, translator and painter
Platon Obukhov has authored twenty fiction books, including science fiction.

 He has worked for Russian newspapers Izvestia (1988—99), Soviet Sport, and others.
 Obukhov is an abstract painter. His works are at private collections and museums of Moscow, Prague, Berlin, Copenhagen.
 Obukhov is an English-Russian translator. He has translated more than 30 books by English-speaking authors, including books by Emerson Hough, Frederick Remington, Frederick Manfred, George Bird Grinnell, and Martin Gilbert.

Novels

Arrest on spying charges
In 1996, Obukhov was arrested in Russia on charges of spying for the United Kingdom. Following his re-trial, on 17 May 2002 his conviction was reaffirmed by the Moscow City Court, but the court further found him not responsible on the grounds of mental illness, and ordered him transferred from prison to a psychiatric hospital.

External links

References

Russian journalists
Russian science fiction writers
20th-century Russian painters
Russian male painters
21st-century Russian painters
1968 births
Living people
20th-century Russian translators
21st-century translators
20th-century Russian male artists
21st-century Russian male artists